4-Nitroacetanilide is a chemical compound which is a nitro derivative of acetanilide.  There are two other isomers of nitroacetanilide, 2-nitroacetanilide and 3-nitroacetanilide.

4-Nitroacetanilide is used as in intermediate in the production of some dyes.

References

Acetanilides
Nitrobenzenes